Squires Peak is a peak marking the eastern extremity of the Playfair Mountains, in Palmer Land. Mapped by United States Geological Survey (USGS) from surveys and U.S. Navy air photos, 1961–67. Named by Advisory Committee on Antarctic Names (US-ACAN) for Donald F. Squires, biologist, member of the Palmer Station-Eastwind Expedition, summer 1965–66.

See also
Mount Kane, 6 nautical miles (11 km) west-southwest of Squires Peak

References

External links
 

Mountains of Palmer Land